The Crowne Plaza Foshan is a hotel in Foshan, Guangdong. It opened in 1987 as the Foshan Hotel. Located in the heart of the Pearl River Delta, Foshan is an old town that has recently seen a transformation brought about by China's booming economy.

History

The hotel became the Crowne Plaza Foshan in December 2008 and is now managed by the InterContinental Hotels Group

References

External links
 Crowne Plaza Foshan website

Buildings and structures in Foshan
Hotels established in 1987
Hotel buildings completed in 1987
Hotels in China